Filatima tridentata is a moth of the family Gelechiidae. It is found in North America, where it has been recorded from California.

The wingspan is 20–23 mm. The forewings are yellowish brown, the basal angle with a conspicuous, oblique black dash and a poorly defined blackish fuscous spot at the end of the cell, with a scattering of yellowish scales irregularly placed around it. There is a smaller spot in the cell at the basal two-fifths and a narrow, but distinct, pale spot at the apical fourth on the costa. An indistinct row of small blackish fuscous spots is found around the apex and termen. The hindwings are greyish fuscous basally shading to dark fuscous around the margins.

The larvae feed on Salix species.

References

Moths described in 1947
Filatima